Stadionul Municipal is a multi-use stadium in Turda, Romania. It is currently used mostly for football matches and is the home ground of Sticla Arieşul Turda. The stadium holds 10,000 people, of which 8,500 are seated.

The venue is a state of degradation.

Gallery

References

Football venues in Romania
Buildings and structures in Cluj County
Turda